Ordzhonikidze or Orjonikidze is a Georgian surname which may refer to:

Ordzhonikidze
Grigoriy Ordzhonikidze (better known as Sergo Ordzhonikidze) (1886–1937), Georgian Bolshevik and Soviet political leader
Sergei Ordzhonikidze, Russian diplomat
Lika Ordzhonikidze, Georgian model

Orjonikidze
Mindora Orjonikidze (1879—1967), Georgian politician
Iza Orjonikidze, Georgian poet and politician

Georgian-language surnames